Gonzalo De Mujica (born 31 January 1989) is an Argentinian professional soccer player who last played as a midfielder for Fort Lauderdale Strikers in the North American Soccer League.

Career

Early career
Born in Buenos Aires, De Mujica attended Stetson University and played for the soccer team, the Stetson Hatters, from 2008 to 2011. While at school he also played for various USL PDL sides like the Central Florida Craze, FC JAX Destroyers, and Orlando City U-23.

Fort Lauderdale Strikers
On 31 January 2013 De Mujica signed for the Fort Lauderdale Strikers of the North American Soccer League. He made his professional debut for the side on 18 May 2013 against the San Antonio Scorpions at Toyota Field in which he came on as a 72nd-minute substitute for Jemal Johnson as Fort Lauderdale lost the match 3–1.

Career statistics

References

External links 
 Fort Lauderdale Strikers Profile .
 Theplayersagent.com Profile

1989 births
Living people
Argentine footballers
Argentine expatriate footballers
Stetson Hatters men's soccer players
Orlando City U-23 players
FC JAX Destroyers players
Fort Lauderdale Strikers players
Argentine emigrants to the United States
Association football midfielders
Expatriate soccer players in the United States
USL League Two players
North American Soccer League players
Footballers from Buenos Aires